Ebenezer Watts House is a historic home located at Rochester in Monroe County, New York. It was built between 1825 and 1827 and remodelled in the 1850s.  It is a two-story brick structure with a hipped roof and cupola in the Italianate style.  It features a Federal style entrance and interior.  It is the oldest surviving residence in downtown Rochester.

It was listed on the National Register of Historic Places in 1996.

References

External links

Houses in Rochester, New York
Houses on the National Register of Historic Places in New York (state)
Historic American Buildings Survey in New York (state)
Federal architecture in New York (state)
Italianate architecture in New York (state)
Houses completed in 1827
National Register of Historic Places in Rochester, New York
1827 establishments in New York (state)